Kushuru (Ancash Quechua for an edible kind of seaweed, also spelled Cushuro) is a mountain in the northern part of the Cordillera Negra in the Andes of Peru, about  high. It is situated in the Ancash Region, Huaylas Province, Santo Toribio District, and in the Santa Province, Cáceres del Perú District. Kushuru lies between Yana Yaku in the southeast and Quñuqranra in the northwest, east of Ichik Wiri.

References 

Mountains of Peru
Mountains of Ancash Region